Marek Kulič (born 11 October 1975) is a former footballer from the Czech Republic. He last played for FC Hradec Králové and has also played for the Czech Republic national football team. He was a second striker, and played 12 times for his country, scoring 3 goals. He has played previously for FC Hradec Králové, AFK Atlantic Lázně Bohdaneč, FK Drnovice, FK Marila Příbram from 1999 to 2003, SK Dynamo České Budějovice from 2003 to 2005, and in FK Mladá Boleslav from 2005 to 2007. After two years in Sparta Prague he transferred back to FK Mladá Boleslav in June 2009, where he served as captain.

Honours
 Czech Cup (1):
 2008

References

External links 
 
 
 Profile on Official Sparta Praha page

1975 births
Living people
Czech footballers
Czech Republic international footballers
Czech First League players
AFK Atlantic Lázně Bohdaneč players
AC Sparta Prague players
Sportspeople from Hradec Králové
FK Mladá Boleslav players
SK Dynamo České Budějovice players
1. FK Příbram players
FK Drnovice players
FC Hradec Králové players
Association football forwards